The Penthouse is a 1989 American-Canadian television film directed by David Greene and starring Robin Givens. It is based on the 1983 novel by Trevor Dudley-Smith.

Plot

Cast
 Robin Givens as Dinah St. Clair
 David Hewlett as Joe Dobson
 Cedric Smith as Commissioner Warner
 Donnelly Rhodes as Lt. Valeri
 Robert Guillaume as Eugene St. Clair

Reception
Jeff Jarvis of People graded the film an F.

References

External links
 
 
 

1989 television films
1989 films
1980s English-language films
Films based on British novels
ABC Movie of the Week
Television shows based on British novels
English-language Canadian films
Canadian television films
Films directed by David Greene
1980s Canadian films